Chicken and waffles is an American dish combining chicken with waffles. It is part of a variety of culinary traditions, including Pennsylvania Dutch cuisine and soul food, and is served in certain specialty restaurants in the United States. Originating as a Pennsylvania Dutch meal, the dish has received notability in the Southern United States.

Description 
Chicken and waffles, as a combined recipe, first appeared in the United States' colonial period in the 1600s in Pennsylvania Dutch country. The traditional Pennsylvania Dutch version consists of a plain waffle with pulled, stewed chicken on top, covered in gravy.

A version using fried chicken is associated with the American South. The soul-food version of chicken and waffles grew in popularity after the opening of the Wells Supper Club in Harlem, New York, in 1938. The waffle is served as it would be for breakfast, with condiments such as butter and syrup. This combination of foods is beloved by many people who are influenced by traditions of soul food passed down from past generations of their families. This version of the dish is popular enough in Baltimore, Maryland to become a local custom.

History

The exact origins of this dish are unknown. Waffles entered American cuisine in the 1600s with European colonists. The food's popularity saw a notable boost after 1789 with Thomas Jefferson's purchase of four waffle irons in Amsterdam.

In the early 1800s, hotels and resorts outside Philadelphia served waffles with fried catfish. Such establishments also served other dishes such as fried chicken, which gradually became the meat of choice due to catfish's limited, seasonal availability. Waffles served with chicken and gravy were noted as a common Sunday dish among the Pennsylvania Dutch by the 1860s.By the end of the 19th century, the dish was a symbol of Pennsylvania Dutch Country, brought on in part by its association with tourism. A 1901 memoir recalled a tavern in the Pittsburgh neighborhood East Liberty in western Pennsylvania, well known for "suppers of spring chickens and waffles." 

By the 1840s, broiled chicken and waffles were the celebrated specialty at Warriner's Tavern in Springfield, Massachusetts, owned by "Uncle" Jeremy Warriner and his wife "Aunt" Phoebe, two well-known abolitionists. Prior to the Civil War, chicken and waffles were extravagant breakfast staples in plantation houses through much of the South, prepared by the well-trained cooks.

In 1909, a Griswold's waffle iron advertisement promised, "You can attend a chicken and waffle supper right at home any time you have the notion if you are the owner of a Griswold's American Waffle Iron."

A traditional story about the origin of the dish in soul food states that because African Americans in the South rarely had the opportunity to eat chicken and were more familiar with flapjacks or pancakes than with waffles, they considered the dish a delicacy. For decades, it remained "a special-occasion meal in African American families."  Other historians, however, cite a scarcity of early evidence of the dish's existence in the South; they place the origin later, after the post-Civil War migration of Southern African-Americans to the North during the Reconstruction Era. The combination of chicken and waffles does not appear in early Southern cookbooks such as Mrs. Porter’s Southern Cookery Book, published in 1871, or in What Mrs. Fisher Knows About Old Southern Cooking, published in 1881 by former slave Abby Fisher. Fisher's cookbook is generally considered the first cookbook written by an African American. The lack of a recipe for the combination of chicken and waffles in Southern cookbooks from the era may suggest a later origin for the dish. Popular culture may have associated the dish with the South by 1917, when Edna Ferber's Fanny Herself mentioned a Chicago restaurant falsely advertising "Southern chicken dinner with waffles and real maple syrup, 35 cents each."

Fried chicken and waffles came to Los Angeles by 1931, when they were served at The Maryland, a restaurant that marketed the dish as a Southern specialty. James M. Cain's 1941 novel Mildred Pierce concerns a woman who finds success serving "chicken-and-waffle dinner" at her Glendale restaurant.

In New York, the dish was served in the African-American community in Harlem as early as the 1930s in such locations as Tillie's Chicken Shack, Richard Wells' jazz nightclub, and particularly the Wells Supper Club. In 1935 Bunny Berigan composed a jazz instrumental titled "Chicken and Waffles".

Since the 1970s, chicken and waffles have gained popularity in Los Angeles due to the fame of former Harlem resident Herb Hudson's restaurant Roscoe's House of Chicken and Waffles, which has become known as a favorite of some Hollywood celebrities, referenced in several movies, and spun off several more into a small chain.

See also
 Chick'nCone

References

External links

American chicken dishes
American cuisine
Waffles
Soul food
Food combinations
Pennsylvania Dutch cuisine
Cuisine of the Southern United States